Kargı is a town in Çorum Province in the Black Sea region of Turkey. It is the seat of Dodurga District. Its population is 5,537 (2022).

History
The first settlement in Kargı is known in the Hellenistic period as Blaene, mentioned by Strabo. From 1867 until 1922, Kargı was part of Angora vilayet.

Economy
The district is known for growing high-quality rice and okra and for producing a particular type of crumbly goat's milk cheese called tulum peyniri.

References

Populated places in Çorum Province
Kargı District
Towns in Turkey
Paphlagonia